The 2010 Night of Champions was the fourth annual Night of Champions professional wrestling pay-per-view (PPV) event produced by World Wrestling Entertainment (WWE). It was held for wrestlers from the promotion's Raw and SmackDown brand divisions. The event took place on September 19, 2010, at the Allstate Arena in the Chicago suburb of Rosemont, Illinois. It was the final Night of Champions held during the first brand split, which ended in August 2011. The concept of the show was that every championship in the company at the time was defended. It was also the first Night of Champions event to feature a non-title match, where Big Show defeated CM Punk.

Seven matches took place at the event. There were two main events: one from Raw and one from SmackDown. In the Raw main event, Randy Orton defeated defending champion Sheamus, John Cena, Wade Barrett, Chris Jericho, and Edge in a six-man elimination challenge match to win the WWE Championship and in the SmackDown main event, Kane defeated The Undertaker in a No Holds Barred match to retain the World Heavyweight Championship. Other prominent matches included Dolph Ziggler retaining the WWE Intercontinental Championship against Kofi Kingston, and Daniel Bryan defeated The Miz to win the WWE United States Championship. 

The event had 165,000 buys, down on the 2009's Night of Champions figure of 267,000 buys.

Production

Background
Night of Champions was an annual pay-per-view (PPV) event produced by World Wrestling Entertainment (WWE) since 2007. The 2010 event was the fourth event in the Night of Champions chronology. It was held on September 19, 2010, at the Allstate Arena in the Chicago suburb of Rosemont, Illinois and featured wrestlers from the Raw and SmackDown brands. 

As per the theme of the event, every championship promoted by WWE at the time was defended. These included the three championships on Raw—the WWE Championship, the United States Championship, and the WWE Women's Championship—the three championships on SmackDown—the World Heavyweight Championship, the Intercontinental Championship, and the WWE Divas Championship—and the promotion's sole tag team championship—the WWE Tag Team Championship, which was available to both brands.

Storylines
Night of Champions featured professional wrestling matches involving different wrestlers from pre-existing scripted feuds, plots, and storylines that played out on World Wrestling Entertainment's (WWE) television programs. Wrestlers portrayed villains or heroes as they followed a series of events that built tension and culminated in a wrestling match or series of matches.

The main rivalry heading into Night of Champions from the Raw brand featured the defending champion Sheamus, Randy Orton, John Cena, Chris Jericho, Edge and Wade Barrett, feuding over the WWE Championship. At the Fatal 4-Way pay-per-view in June, Sheamus won his second WWE Championship in a fatal four-way match against Cena, Edge and Orton after interference from The Nexus and, at Money in the Bank in July, defeated Cena to retain the title in a steel cage match, again after The Nexus interfered. At SummerSlam, Sheamus defended the championship against Orton and lost via disqualification, but as per WWE rules, retained the title. On the August 23 episode of Raw, the Anonymous Raw General Manager set up a series of matches that night to determine the next contender for the WWE Championship, and allowed Sheamus himself to handpick his opponent for Night of Champions. The matches saw Edge defeat R-Truth, Jericho defeat The Great Khali, and Orton defeat John Morrison and Ted DiBiase in a triple threat match, while The Miz defeated Cena via disqualification. During the night, Barrett called off The Nexus' "truce" with Sheamus, and at the end of night, decided to cash-in his right (due to winning the first season of NXT) to challenge for the WWE Championship at Night of Champions. However, the general manager announced that Sheamus was to defend his WWE Championship against Orton, Cena, Jericho, Edge, and Barrett in a six-pack challenge at Night of Champions. On the 900th episode of Raw, Chris Jericho added a stipulation that if he did not win the championship, he would leave WWE. However, the following week, he wrestled in a match with John Morrison under the stipulation that he would be taken out of the Night of Champions match if he did not win. Jericho lost the match and was removed from the six-pack challenge. On the September 13 episode of Raw, the anonymous Raw general manager announced the match was changed to an elimination format. In addition, the general manager also offered Jericho an opportunity to re-insert himself in the match via a handicap steel cage match against The Hart Dynasty (David Hart Smith and Tyson Kidd). Jericho was successful in defeating the duo and thus was re-admitted to the six-pack challenge.

The main rivalry from the SmackDown brand featured the champion Kane against his storyline half-brother The Undertaker for the World Heavyweight Championship. Approximately three months prior, The Undertaker had been mysteriously put in a vegetative state. Upon finding out about this, Kane had attempted to seek vengeance against the culprit. At the Money in the Bank pay-per-view, Kane had won the Money in the Bank ladder match and cashed in his contract later that night against then champion Rey Mysterio. Mysterio used his rematch clause on Kane to challenge him at SummerSlam, but failed to regain the title. During the weeks leading up to SummerSlam, Kane was convinced that Mysterio was the one behind the attack on his brother and upon defeating him, attempted to put him in a casket when The Undertaker appeared inside it. Upon seeing his brother again, Kane attacked The Undertaker, turning him heel. On the September 3 episode of SmackDown, Kane challenged The Undertaker, putting his championship on the line and promising to end The Undertaker for good. Then, on the September 10 episode of SmackDown, Undertaker challenged Kane to make the title match No Holds Barred, which he agreed to a week later.

Another rivalry involved an inter-brand match involving the WWE Divas Champion Melina and the WWE Women's Champion Layla and Michelle McCool, collectively known as Lay-Cool, in a title unification Match. On May 14, Layla had pinned Beth Phoenix in a handicap match to win the Women's championship. However, both Layla and McCool decided to make themselves Co-Women's Champion (as, by their logic, the Championship was won in a handicap match), going as far as splitting the main championship belt to keep co-reign. At SummerSlam, Melina had won the Divas Championship from Alicia Fox. After the match, Lay-Cool attacked Melina, stating they had defeated everyone on the SmackDown brand while champions and decided to go after the Raw Divas. On the 900th episode of Raw, LayCool challenged Melina to a title unification match at Night of Champions. Melina accepted under one condition, their match would be a lumberjill match.

Another rivalry from Raw involved champion The Miz against Daniel Bryan for the WWE United States Championship. The feud had begun during the first season of NXT, when The Miz was Bryan's storyline mentor, and felt that Bryan did not respect him. Bryan had been released from WWE in June for strangling Justin Roberts with his necktie, but returned at SummerSlam to join Team WWE, taking The Miz's place. Afterward, the two resumed their rivalry, distracting or attacking each other during matches, with The Miz joined by his rookie from the second season of NXT, Alex Riley. On the September 6 episode of Raw, Bryan challenged The Miz for the United States Championship, which The Miz accepted.

Another SmackDown rivalry involved the champion Dolph Ziggler against Kofi Kingston for the WWE Intercontinental Championship. On the August 6 episode of SmackDown, Ziggler defeated Kingston for his Intercontinental Championship after his manager Vickie Guerrero distracted the referee during Kingston's pinfall on Ziggler. Kingston got a rematch at SummerSlam only for The Nexus to interfere  resulting in a no contest. Following this, Kingston got several rematches against Ziggler, only to be disqualified for one of them and counted out for another. To correct this, General Manager Theodore Long declared that Ziggler would defend his title against Kingston and if he were to be disqualified or counted out, then the title would go to Kingston.

Event

Preliminary matches
The actual pay-per-view opened with Dolph Ziggler (accompanied by Kaitlyn and Vickie Guerrero) defending the Intercontinental Championship against Kofi Kingston. In the end, as Kingston attempted Trouble In Paradise on Ziggler, Ziggler avoided Kingston, trapping Kingston's leg in the ropes. Ziggler executed a Zig Zag on Kingston to retain the title.

Next, Big Show faced CM Punk. In the end, as Punk attempted a Springboard Clothesline on Big Show, Big Show delivered a Spear in mid-air and executed a KO Punch on Punk to win the match.

After that, The Miz defended the United States Championship against Daniel Bryan. Bryan forced Miz to submit to the Lebell Lock to win the title.

In the fourth match, Women's Champion Michelle McCool faced Divas Champion Melina in a Winner Takes All Lumberjill match to unify the titles. In the end, Layla interfered, starting a brawl involving the Lumberjills. McCool executed a Big Boot on Melina to win the match.

Main event matches
In the fifth match, Kane defended the World Heavyweight Championship against The Undertaker in a No Holds Barred match. At the start of the match, Undertaker attacked Kane on the entrance ramp, throwing Kane into a pillar on the entrance ramp. After brawling inside the ring, Kane threw the broadcast table cover at Undertaker. Undertaker performed a Clothesline on Kane, knocking Kane over the barricade into the timekeeper's area, and leapt over the barricade onto Kane. In the end, Undertaker delivered a Chokeslam to Kane for a near-fall. Undertaker attempted a Tombstone Piledriver on Kane but Kane countered into his own Tombstone Piledriver on Undertaker to retain the title.
 
Later, a Tag Team Turmoil match for the WWE Tag Team Championship took place. Defending champions The Hart Dynasty (David Hart Smith and Tyson Kidd) and The Usos (Jimmy Uso and Jey Uso) began the match. The Hart Dynasty were eliminated after Kidd was pinned by Jey following a Superkick. Santino Marella and Vladimir Kozlov entered next. Santino and Kozlov were eliminated after Jimmy pinned Marella following a Samoan Drop. Evan Bourne and Mark Henry entered fourth. The Usos were eliminated after Bourne pinned Jimmy following an Air Bourne. Cody Rhodes and Drew McIntyre entered last. Rhodes performed a Cross Rhodes on Bourne to win the title.

In the main event, Sheamus defended the WWE Championship against Wade Barrett, Randy Orton, John Cena, Edge and Chris Jericho in a Six-pack challenge elimination match. Orton eliminated Jericho after an RKO. Cena eliminated Edge after an Attitude Adjustment. After interference by The Nexus, Barrett eliminated Cena after a Wasteland. The Nexus attacked Orton but Cena used a chair to attack The Nexus. Orton eliminated Barrett after an RKO. Sheamus executed a Brogue Kick on Orton for a near-fall. As Sheamus attempted a High Cross on Orton, Orton countered and pinned Sheamus after an RKO to win the title.

Reception
A sellout crowd of 13,851 people attended Night of Champions live at the Allstate Arena in Rosemont, Illinois.

Aftermath
This was the final Night of Champions to feature the Women's Championship, as at this event, it was unified with the Divas Championship, which became briefly known as the Unified WWE Divas Championship, which subsequently became available to both brands. This would also be the final Night of Champions held during the first brand split, which ended in August 2011, just prior to the 2011 event. Also in April 2011, the promotion ceased using its full name of World Wrestling Entertainment with the "WWE" name becoming an orphaned initialism.

Results

 The lumberjills were: Alicia Fox, Brie Bella, Eve Torres, Gail Kim, Jillian Hall, Kelly Kelly, Layla, Maryse, Natalya, Nikki Bella, Rosa Mendes and Tamina.

Tag Team Turmoil match

Elimination Six-pack challenge

References

External links
Official Night of Champions website

2010 in Illinois
2010s in Chicago
Professional wrestling in the Chicago metropolitan area
2010
Events in Rosemont, Illinois
2010 WWE pay-per-view events
September 2010 events in the United States